Ionuţ Florea (born 17 July 1986), is a Romanian futsal player who plays for Dava Deva and the Romanian national futsal team.

References

External links
UEFA profile

1986 births
Living people
Futsal goalkeepers
Romanian men's futsal players